Enrique Ángel Angelelli Carletti (17 June 19234 August 1976) was a bishop of the Catholic Church in Argentina who was assassinated during the Dirty War for his involvement with social issues.

Angelelli, whose commitment to the "Church of the Poor" offered a model for the future Pope Francis, was murdered two months after U.S. Secretary of State Henry Kissinger gave Argentina's ruling military dirty "warriors" a green light for their illegal repression, which included the torture and murder of tens of thousands of political opponents.

His cause of sainthood opened in 2015. In June 2018 Pope Francis decreed he had died as a martyr for the faith, allowing Angelelli and his companions to be beatified. The beatification of Angelelli and his three companions was celebrated at La Rioja City Park in La Rioja on 27 April 2019.

Life

Priesthood
Angelelli was the son of Italian immigrants and was born in Córdoba. He entered the seminary of Our Lady of Loreto at 15 years of age. He was then sent to Rome to finish his studies. He was ordained a priest on 9 October 1949.

Returning to Córdoba, he worked in a parish, founded youth movements and visited Córdoba's slums. He focused his pastoral work on the conditions of the poor. Pope John XXIII appointed him auxiliary bishop of the Archdiocese of Córdoba on 12 December 1960. He became involved in labor union conflicts and worked with other priests looking for a renewal of the church, which led to his arrest. The newly appointed Archbishop of Córdoba, Raúl Primatesta, relieved him of his duties for part of 1965, exiling him to Colegio Villa Eucharistica as chaplain in the convent of the Adoratrices. He took part in the first, third, and fourth sessions of the Second Vatican Council in 1962, 1964, and 1965.

La Rioja
Angelelli gave tacit authorisation to the May 1968 first Encounter of the Movement of Priests for the Third World, though he never joined the movement himself.

On 3 July 1968, Pope Paul VI appointed Angelelli bishop of the Diocese of La Rioja, in northwest Argentina.

In La Rioja Angelelli encouraged miners, rural workers and domestic workers to form unions, as well as cooperatives to manufacture knitting works, bricks, clocks and bread, and to claim and work idle lands. One of these co-operatives asked for the expropriation of a latifundio (large estate) that had grown through the appropriation of smaller estates whose  owners could not pay their debts. Governor Carlos Menem promised he would deliver the estate to the co-operative.

On 13 June 1973, Angelelli went to Anillaco, Menem's birth town, to preside over the patronal feasts. He was met by a mob led by merchants and landowners, among them Amado Menem, the governor's brother, and his sons César and Manuel. The mob entered the church by force, and when Angelelli suspended the celebrations and left, they threw stones at him. Governor Menem withdrew his support for the co-operative citing "social unrest". Angelelli denounced conservative groups, called off religious celebrations in the diocese, and declared a temporary interdict against the Menems and their supporters.

The Superior General of the Jesuits, Pedro Arrupe, and the Archbishop of Santa Fe, Vicente Faustino Zazpe, sent by the Holy See as an overseer, visited La Rioja and supported Angelelli, who had offered his resignation and asked the Pope to ratify his actions or withdraw his trust. Before Zazpe, the interdicted demanded Angelelli's removal, while military marches were broadcast through a loudspeaker. Almost all priests of the diocese met with Zazpe to support Angelelli and told him that "the powerful manipulated the faith to preserve an unjust and oppressed situation of the people" and to take advantage of the "cheap, underpaid workforce".

On the other hand, the president of the Argentine Episcopal Conference, said that the Conference should not mediate, and Papal Nuncio Lino Zanini openly supported the interdicted, to whom he gave crucifixes as gifts.

Zazpe concluded his inspection by concelebrating Mass with Angelelli and expressing his full support for his pastoral work and doctrinal orthodoxy.

The Dirty War
The brief presidency of Isabel Perón (1974–76) was marked by the beginning of the Dirty War, which soon escalated into bombings, kidnappings, torture and assassinations, triggering a persecution of those holding left-wing views.

On 12 February 1976, the vicar of the diocese of La Rioja and two members of a social activist movement were arrested by the military. On 24 March, a coup d'état ousted Isabel Perón and all the nation's governors, including Carlos Menem of La Rioja (whom Angelleli had served as confessor). Angelleli petitioned General Osvaldo Pérez Battaglia, the new military interventor of La Rioja, for information on the vicar's and the activists' whereabouts. Getting no response, he travelled to Córdoba to speak to Luciano Benjamín Menéndez, then Commander of the Third Army Corps. Menéndez threatened and warned Angelelli: "It is you who have to be careful."

Murder
Angelelli allegedly knew that he was being targeted for assassination by the military; people close to him had often heard him say, "It's my turn next." On 4 August 1976 he was driving a truck, together with Father Arturo Pinto, back from a Mass celebrated in the town of El Chamical in homage to two murdered priests, Carlos de Dios Murias and Gabriel Longueville, carrying three folders with notes about both cases.

According to Father Pinto, a car started following them, then another one, and in Punta de los Llanos, people forced the truck between them until toppling it. After being unconscious for a while, Pinto saw Angelelli dead in the road, with the back of his neck showing grave injuries "as if they had beaten him".

The area was quickly surrounded by police and military personnel. An ambulance was sent for. Angelelli's body was taken to the city of La Rioja. The autopsy revealed several broken ribs and a star-shaped fracture in the occipital bone, consistent with a blow given using a blunt object. The truck's brakes and steering wheel were intact, and there were no bullet marks.

The police report stated that Pinto had been driving, momentarily lost control of the vehicle, and when trying to get back on the road a tyre blew out; Angelelli was said to have been killed as the truck turned several times. Judge Rodolfo Vigo accepted the report. A few days afterwards, prosecutor Martha Guzmán Loza recommended closing the case, calling it "a traffic event".

Other bishops (Jaime de Nevares, Jorge Novak and Miguel Hesayne) called the event a murder, even during the dictatorship, but the rest of the Church kept silent.

On 19 June 1986, with the country under democratic rule, La Rioja judge Aldo Morales ruled that it had been "a homicide, coldly premeditated, and expected by the victim". When some military personnel became involved in the accusation, the Armed Forces tried to block the investigation, but the judge rejected their claims. The case passed to the Supreme Court of Argentina, which in turn sent it to the Federal Chamber of Córdoba. The Córdoba tribunal said it was possible that orders had come from Commander Menéndez of the Third Corps.

In April 1990, the Ley de Punto Final ("Full Stop Law") ended the investigation against the three military accused of the murder (José Carlos González, Luis Manzanelli and Ricardo Román Oscar Otero). This law and the Law of Due Obedience were repealed in 2005, and in August of that year the case was re-opened. The Supreme Court split the case in two: the accusation against the military was sent to the tribunals in Córdoba, and the possible participation of civilians in the murder was sent to La Rioja. Former Commander Menéndez was called on by the La Rioja tribunal on 16 May 2006 but made no statement. On 5 July 2014, Menéndez and Luis Estrella, who had headed the Air Force base and torture center at El Chamical, were sentenced to life for Angelelli's murder.

Position of the Church
After the murder of Angelelli, the Catholic Church officially accepted the car accident story, but some of its members (as mentioned above) spoke against it. L'Osservatore Romano reported his death as "a strange accident", and Cardinal Juan Carlos Aramburu, Archbishop of Buenos Aires, denied it was a crime.

Ten years later, even after the sentence passed by Judge Morales in La Rioja, the hierarchy of the Church continued to avoid any references to murder. In 2001, a declaration by the Argentine Episcopal Conference stated, "Death found him while fulfilling a difficult mission, accompany[ing] the communities hurt by the murder of their shepherds."

Homages to Angelelli
In February 1986, U.S. Senator Edward M. Kennedy, during a journey to South America to highlight human rights, paid homage to Angelelli at the La Rioja Cathedral. In 1993, Martin Edwin Andersen, the former Newsweek and Washington Post special correspondent in Buenos Aires who travelled with Kennedy to La Rioja, dedicated his investigative history, "Dossier Secreto: Argentina's Desaparecidos and the Myth of the Dirty 'War,'" to Angelelli, and to human rights heroes Patricia Derian, who spearheaded the U.S. human rights revolution of President Jimmy Carter, and Emilio Mignone, the founder of the Centro de Estudios Legales y Sociales (CELS), "three people who spoke out and made a difference."

On 2 August 2006, two days before the 30th anniversary of Angelelli's death, President Néstor Kirchner signed a decree declaring 4 August a national day of mourning, and gave a speech in the Casa Rosada "commemorating the religious workers [who were] victims of state terrorism". Alba Lanzillotto, a member of the Grandmothers of the Plaza de Mayo who used to attend mass sung by bishop Angelelli, spoke then regarding the belated homage of the Catholic hierarchy: "I don't want Monsignor to be made into a stamp. He has to be alive in our memory."

On the day of the anniversary, Jorge Bergoglio, Archbishop of Buenos Aires (later Pope Francis), celebrated Mass in the Cathedral of La Rioja in memory of Angelelli. In his homily he said that Angelelli "got stones thrown at him because he preached the Gospel, and shed his blood for it". Bergoglio also quoted Tertullian's sentence "thé blood of the martyrs is the seed of the Church". This was the first official homage of the Church to Angelelli, and the first time that the word martyr was used with reference to his murder by Church authorities in this context. After the Mass, about 2,000 people, including the governor of La Rioja Ángel Maza, paid homage to Angelelli in Punta de los Llanos, the site of his death.

On 27 April 2019, shortly before his beatification, Congregation for the Causes of Saints Prefect Cardinal Angelo Becciu compared Angelelli to assassinated Catholic saint Oscar Romero and even labelled Angelelli as "Argentina's Romero."

Beatification
Pope Francis voiced support for the cause of sainthood for Angelelli which commenced on 21 April 2015 with the formal declaration of "nihil obstat" (nothing against) to the cause. He was bestowed the title of Servant of God as a result. The official diocesan process commenced on 13 October 2015. On 8 June 2018 Francis approved the decree that Angelelli and three others murdered in La Rioja at the time–Carlos Murias, Gabriel Longueville, Wenceslao Pedernera–were martyred out of hatred for the faith and called the Bishop of Rioja, Marcelo Colombo with the news. The beatification ceremony then took place on 27 April 2019 and Cardinal Giovanni Angelo Becciu presided over the celebration, which took place at La Rioja City Park in La Rioja, on the Pope's behalf.

See also
 Roman Catholicism in Argentina

References

Additional sources
 Nunca Más. Report of CONADEP, 1984.  The case of the Bishop of La Rioja, Monsignor Enrique Angelelli...
 
 Argentine Episcopal Conference, Diocesan Bulletin, May 2001. Mons. Angelelli: Vivió y murió como pastor.
 
 
 
 
 
Document collection

External links

  Centro Tiempo Latinoamericano  — Photo-audio-video gallery, biography, bibliography.
  Enrique Angelelli – Pastor y Mártir de tierra adentro — Biography, photographic gallery, online resources.

1923 births
1976 deaths
People from Córdoba, Argentina
Argentine people of Italian descent
Beatifications by Pope Francis
People killed in the Dirty War
20th-century Roman Catholic bishops in Argentina
People murdered in Argentina
20th-century Roman Catholic martyrs
Participants in the Second Vatican Council
Argentine beatified people
Roman Catholic bishops of Córdoba
Roman Catholic bishops of La Rioja